Bamum Supplement is a Unicode block containing the characters of the historic stage A-F of the Bamum script, used for writing the Bamum language of western Cameroon. The modern stage G characters, which include many characters used for stage A-F orthographies, are included in the Bamum block.

Block

History
The following Unicode-related documents record the purpose and process of defining specific characters in the Bamum Supplement block:

References 

Unicode blocks